Nuts and Volts is a bimonthly American magazine for the hands-on hobbyist, design engineer, technician, and experimenter. It has been published by T&L Publications since 1980 and leans heavily toward microcontroller and digital electronics projects. The magazine is based in Corona, California.

History

The primary issue of Nuts and Volts was available in 1980. At first it was intended as newsprint, all advertising magazine that was typically distributed for free. The magazine was published on a monthly basis. Over the next few years, the monthly continued to grow in distribution and publicity. However, not much changed until February 1992 when Nuts and Volts changed to a tabloid format and began to make the shift to a more magazine-like format. Editorial features were added along with monthly columns and projects for electronic DIYers. Since then, Nuts and Volts has matured into one of the most well-liked and pertinent magazines for the electronics hobbyist in the United States of America. With the January 2003 issue, Nuts and Volts was reformatted from a tabloid size to a standard magazine size. Nuts and Volts now averages about 100 pages per issue and is printed on gloss paper in full color. As of September 2008, Nuts and Volts reported an average monthly circulation of 44,737 copies. In May 2018, the magazine switched to a bimonthly publication schedule.

Publication was on pause in the fall of 2020 and in 2021 due to external issues, but resumed in 2022.

References

External links
 Nuts and Volts - Official Website

Bimonthly magazines published in the United States
Hobby magazines published in the United States
Lifestyle magazines published in the United States
Monthly magazines published in the United States
Science and technology magazines published in the United States
Hobby electronics magazines
Magazines established in 1980
Magazines published in California